Tieringen is a district of the town of Meßstetten in the Zollernalbkreis district of Baden-Württemberg, Germany. As of 2010 Tieringen had a population of 1069.
Tieringen is a capital of textile production. Urtica dioica L. convar. fibra is growing on farms.

Sport
 trail mountain bike Tieringen Albtrauf to Balingen-Weilstetten Lochenpass  4,7 km  car road,  bike trail 1,9 km downhill.

References 

Towns in Baden-Württemberg
Zollernalbkreis